Stephanos Mar Theodosius (1924-2007) was the bishop of the Calcutta diocese of the  Malankara Orthodox Church.

He was born K.K Punnoose on 2 October 1924 in Pathamuttam, Vakathanam.
He was ordained as Ramban in 15 February 1975 at St. Mary's Orthodox Church Puthenkavu and in 16 February as a Bishop at Niranam Valiyapally.

In the 1960s he studied in the United States, receiving a BD from the  General Theological Seminary, New York 1966, and a STN from Berkley Divinity School at Yale University  in 1967.  The General Theological Seminary awarded him an honorary D.D. in 1990.

He was the first bishop of Madras Diocese in 1975 and became the first Bishop of Calcutta diocese in 1979.

He was the director of St Thomas Orthodox Church Mission one of the prior mission outside Kerala. He also had established schools and colleges.
He died on 5 November 2007 and was buried in St Thomas Ashram Chapel, Bhilai

References

External links
http://www.stmarysoscr.org/his-grace-dr-stephanos-mar-theodosius 
http://www.st-thomas-orthodox-dc.org/resources/archives/obituarytheodosios

1924 births
2007 deaths
People from Kottayam district
Malankara Orthodox Syrian Church bishops
Berkeley Divinity School alumni
General Theological Seminary alumni
Deaths in Oman